This is a list of Belgian television related events from 1966.

Events

Debuts

Television shows

Ending this year

Births
2 April - Ivan Pecnik, actor
6 May - Steph Goossens, actor
27 August - Jo De Poorter, TV & radio host, journalist & actor
10 December - Kathy Pauwels, journalist & TV host

Deaths